Rob or Robert Burch may refer to:

 Rob Burch (footballer) (born 1984), English retired football goalkeeper
 Rob Burch (politician) (born 1946), American politician
 Robert Burch (American football) (1886–1967), American football player and coach
 Robert J. Burch (1925–2007), American writer